Sir Alan Stewart Orr  (21 February 1911 – 3 April 1991) was a British barrister specialising in taxation who rose to be a High Court judge and a Lord Justice of Appeal. After 1958 he was known as Alan Orr QC, from 1965 as Mr Justice Orr, and from 1971 as Lord Justice Orr.

During the Second World War, Orr served in the Royal Air Force Volunteer Reserve, became a wing commander, and was appointed an Officer of the Order of the British Empire for his wartime service.

Career
A son of William Orr and Doris Kemsley, of Great Wakering, Essex, and a grandson of the Rev. Robert Workman Orr, United Free Church minister of Brechin, Orr was born in Rochford, Essex, raised in Scotland, and educated there at Fettes College and the University of Edinburgh, where he graduated MA in 1933, before proceeding to Balliol College, Oxford. He then joined the Middle Temple in the City of London to train as a barrister and was called to the English bar in July 1936. During the Second World War, he served in the Royal Air Force Volunteer Reserve, was promoted to Acting Wing Commander, and in 1944 was appointed an Officer of the Order of the British Empire.

Orr was a barrister in the chambers of Sir Wintringham Stable at 2, Crown Office Row, which in the 1970s moved premises and became known as Fountain Court Chambers. In the late 1940s and early 1950s, he started to build the chambers' reputation for commercial litigation, together with Leslie Scarman QC and Melford Stevenson QC, supported by a notable clerk, Cyril Batchelor. He was a member of the General Council of the Bar from 1953 to 1957. Well known as a "tax devil", Orr was raised to Queen's Counsel in 1958, and the same year was appointed as Recorder of New Windsor, a part-time judicial role.

By 1962, he had become head of his chambers. In April 1963, he was the Guest of Honour at the annual dinner of the Institute of Chartered Accountants of Scotland. In August 1964 he became a deputy chairman of the Oxfordshire Quarter Sessions.

In 1965 Orr was appointed as a High Court judge, joining the Probate, Divorce, and Admiralty Division, which was unusual, as he had only rarely appeared in it as a counsel. On 12 November 1965, he was knighted by Queen Elizabeth II at Buckingham Palace. In 1967 he was elected as a Master of the Bench of the Honourable Society of the Middle Temple.

On 20 April 1971, together with Sir John Stephenson, Orr was appointed a Lord Justice of Appeal. On the same day, Sir John Passmore Widgery was created Lord Widgery and became Lord Chief Justice. Judge Alfred Hollings QC was appointed to replace Orr in the Probate, Divorce, and Admiralty Division of the High Court, and Orr was also named as a member of the Privy Council of the United Kingdom.

Orr retired as a Lord Justice in 1980, shortly after a less senior man, Geoffrey Lane, had been chosen by the Lord Chancellor, Lord Hailsham, to succeed Widgery as Lord Chief Justice.

When he died in 1991, The Times said in its obituary:

Notable cases
In 1963 and 1964, Orr represented George Wigg, a Labour member of parliament, in a High Court action for libel against Angus Maude, a Conservative member. He won the case, and substantial damages were awarded.

In October 1966, the spy George Blake escaped from HM Prison Wormwood Scrubs and fled from Great Britain to the Soviet Union, and a month later his wife, with whom he had three children, began divorce proceedings against him. In the High Court of Justice in March 1967, Orr granted her a decree nisi in Blake's absence, on the grounds that the conviction of a spouse for treason can amount to cruelty or constructive desertion, and also awarded the custody of the couple's three sons to Mrs Blake.

On 17 December 1968, Orr granted the actress Britt Ekland a decree nisi for divorce on the grounds of cruelty by Peter Sellers, who did not contest the proceedings.

Private life
In 1933, Orr married Mariana Frances Lilian, a daughter of Captain J. C. Lang, King's Own Scottish Borderers. In 1973 they were reported to be living at Highfield, Harmer Green, Welwyn, Hertfordshire. They had four sons James, Gavin, Mark, and Giles, and Lady Orr died in February 1986.

Orr was a member of the Oxford and Cambridge Club. He died on 3 April 1991 at Kineton Manor Nursing Home, Kineton, Warwickshire.

Portraits of Orr by Walter Bird and Rex Coleman of Baron Studios are in the National Portrait Gallery.

Notes

External links
 

1911 births
1991 deaths
Alumni of Balliol College, Oxford
Alumni of the University of Edinburgh
British barristers
20th-century English judges
Probate, Divorce and Admiralty Division judges
Knights Bachelor
Lords Justices of Appeal
Members of the Judicial Committee of the Privy Council
Officers of the Order of the British Empire
People educated at Fettes College
People from Welwyn
Royal Air Force officers
Royal Air Force Volunteer Reserve personnel of World War II
Members of the Middle Temple